Newton Garver (April 24, 1928 – February 8, 2014) was an American philosopher and Professor of Philosophy at University at Buffalo.
He is known for his works on Wittgenstein.

Books
 Derrida & Wittgenstein
 This Complicated Form of Life
 Limits to Power: Some Friendly Reminders
 Nonviolence and community: Reflections on the Alternatives to Violence Project
 Jesus, Jefferson, and the Task of Friends
 Wittgenstein and approaches to clarity

References

External links
 

1928 births
2014 deaths
American philosophers
American philosophy academics
Philosophy writers
Cornell University alumni
University at Buffalo faculty
Derrida scholars
Wittgensteinian philosophers
Alumni of the University of Oxford